is Japanese for genus Capsicum, or specifically the species Capsicum annuum, and commonly translated as chili pepper. When the term is used in English, it refers to any number of chili peppers or chili pepper-related products from Japan, including:

 Shichimi, or Shichimi tōgarashi, a condiment that is a mixture of seven different ingredients that varies by maker

 Shishito, or Shishi tōgarashi, a small, mild variety of Capsicum annuum

 Niji Iro Tōgarashi, a 1990 manga series